HaKfar HaYarok ("The Green Village") is a youth village in Israel, located in southern Ramat HaSharon, along the northern border of Tel Aviv-Yafo.

Name
Gershon Zak, the founder of the village, called it in 1950 "Green Village", without a definite article, with the intention to name it after David Ben-Gurion (1886–1973), whose original name was Gryn or Grün, lit. "green" in Yiddish or German. However, many people did not understand the message contained in the name, and over the years a definite article became added to the institution. Another 20 years later, once the death of Israel's third Prime Minister, Levi Eshkol (1895–1969), occurred before that of the older Ben-Gurion, "the green village" was called after him, becoming since "The Levi Eshkol Green Village".

History

Roughly a quarter of the students at Kfar Hayarok are boarding school students. Other students commute from communities across central Israel, they are attracted by the special study courses offered. Some of these programs include an educational track taught in English, veterinary studies and an arts program.

Today, the village has  2,500 students, from ages 12 to 20 (both residential students and external students).  Each year a group of recent high school graduates do "Shnat Sherut" volunteer service prior to their IDF induction, it's possible that they come to live in the village as program counselors for the residential students.

HaKfar HaYarok has taken steps towards becoming an experimental youth village, with the support of Ministry of Education. This program is based on environmental leadership.

Schools

Anthroposophical school
Within the village there is an anthroposophical school: the Waldorf Urim school, which houses a teacher training seminary and a kindergarten that operates according to the Waldorf (or Steiner) method.

College
The college offers one-year and two-year courses.

Junior high school
The Junior High School, which includes 7th, 8th Grade Mofet Science Classes, is intended for highly motivated students with scientific orientation. The program includes classes in mathematics, chemistry or biology, computers, chess. The Mofet section prepares students for matriculation exams in the 10th and 11th grades, enabling them to start their higher education during the 11th-12th grades.

The high school offers a unique program called "Manhigut" ("leadership"), that emphasizes the less scientific more humanic classes.
 
The Junior High School also offers a 7th and 9th Grade Life Science program, which focuses on biology and animal behavior.

The high-school is one of the most advanced of its kind, incorporating advanced teaching methods and following the "22 Project" framework, using demonstrates alternative methods of teaching and student assessment.  The school offers various majors in life-sciences, agriculture, music, multimedia, fashion design, computer-aided vehicle diagnostics, electronics, and information systems.

Special program for gifted students
In partnership with the Gifted Students Department of the Ministry of Education, HaKfar HaYarok offers a special program for gifted students. To be accepted, students are first evaluated by the Karni Institute in Kfar Saba.

Eastern Mediterranean International School 
The village is home to the Eastern Mediterranean International School (EMIS), an international boarding school with students from more than 40 countries who take the International Baccalaureate (IB) curriculum or an original one-year Pre-DP program. The school was established in 2014 by Oded Rose and as of 2018 has around 170 students enrolled. EMIS became a project of Union for the Mediterranean (UfM) in June 2016 and has been supported by them in various projects such as the annual YOCOPAS (Youth Organised Collaboration on Peace and Sustainability). EMIS includes students from all over the world, with around 20% Israeli students 20% Palestinian or Arab students and 60% international students with aims of promoting and achieving the school's mission statement; "making education a force for peace and sustainability in the Middle East." Along with its mission statement, the school is also defined as a "school for change", with the founder,  Rose, calling it "a platform for change, for entrepreneurship, for peace, sustainability, for dreams and for hope." Throughout its existence EMIS has partnered with The Leon Charney Resolution Center, which shares similar goals to EMIS and believes in dialogue and the value of peace and holds annual peace simulations with engaging students. EMIS actively discusses the ongoing Israeli–Palestinian conflict and aims to use education to provide a platform for change within the many communities and cultures involved, carrying out annual conferences, projects, and activities for passionate students from EMIS and for interested students from the region or abroad.

Notable alumni

Yaron London (born 1940), media personality, journalist, actor, and songwriter
Micha Ullman (born 1939), sculptor and art professor
Micha Tomkiewicz (born 1939), scientist, writer and professor
Yisrael Poliakov (1941–2007), comedian, singer and actor, member of the "Pale-Face Trackers" (Gashashim) ensemble
Benny Gantz (born 1959), 20th chief of general staff of Israel
David J. Steiner (1965–2016), documentary filmmaker, educator, writer, rabbi and political activist

See also
Givat Haviva – a left-wing, shared society oriented educational institute in Israel
Hand in Hand: Center for Jewish Arab Education in Israel
List of Israel Prize recipients
Neve Shalom – a cooperative village jointly founded by Israeli Jews and Palestinian-Israeli Arabs

References

External links 
  
 Times of Israel article about EMIS boarding school (February 20, 2016)

Youth villages in Israel
Populated places in Central District (Israel)
Boarding schools in Israel
Israel Prize in education recipients
Israel Prize recipients that are organizations
1950 establishments in Israel
Ramat HaSharon
Buildings and structures in Central District (Israel)
Commemoration of David Ben-Gurion
Commemoration of Levi Eshkol